Evciler is a village in Anamur district of Mersin Province, Turkey. The population of Evciler is 643  as of 2011.

References

Villages in Anamur District